The Cappuccino Songs is the sixth studio album by British singer-songwriter Tanita Tikaram, released by Mother in 1998.

Background

In 1996, Tikaram left WEA, her label of eight years, and spent some time pursuing other interests than music, including art and travel. For her next studio album, Tikaram decided to re-evaluate her musical direction and reinvent her image. She signed to a new label, Mother Records, and found new management. On this album, Tikaram chose to work with Italian musician Marco Sabiu, who produced the album and co-wrote seven of the tracks. The two had first worked together in 1996, when Sabiu and his producing partner Charlie Mallozzi (known collectively as The Rapino Brothers) produced Tikaram's version of "And I Think of You - E penso a te", which was included on The Best of Tanita Tikaram. The pair's collaboration resulted in an album with a distinctively poppier, more electronic sound than Tikaram's earlier folk-rock releases.

Speaking of her collaboration with Sabiu, Tikaram revealed in 1998, 

Like on her previous album, 1995's Lovers in the City, Tikaram collaborated with the London Session Orchestra for the string sections on her new album. She also recorded ABBA's "The Day Before You Came", one of the few times she has covered another artist's song. In 1998, she described her version as "a bit spooky, a bit weird, almost electro". She added that "Amore Si" has a "very kitsch, melodramatic love story", and "Back in Your Arms" and "If I Ever" are "straight European pop songs, with a twist". "I Don't Want to Lose at Love" samples the 1992 song "Seelinnikoi" by the Finnish folk music band Värttinä, who receive a co-writing credit.

In later years, Tikaram has described The Cappuccino Songs as her "poppiest album" but one which she feels some ambivalence towards. She revealed in 2020, "The record company got very excited and brought in a star producer. To be honest, the whole thing became a bit of a nightmare for me and Marco, so much so that I sort of blanked the album out of my mind. My ambivalence about some of the songs stems from the feeling that some are 'well-written' as oppose[d] to [being] written from the heart. Perhaps a lack of identity if a risk you take in a collaboration." However, she added that on reflection she enjoys the album's "Europeanness", "variety" and Sabiu's "fabulous" arrangements.

Release
The Cappuccino Songs was released in continental Europe and Japan. After promotion of this album ended, Tikaram was let go from Mother Records and retired from the music scene for several years. Three singles were released from the album: "Stop Listening", "I Don't Wanna Lose at Love" and "If I Ever". The Italian and Japanese pressings of the album featured "And I Think of You - E penso a te" as a bonus track, and it was released as a promotional single in Italy in late 1998.

Critical reception

On its release, David Cheal of The Daily Telegraph praised The Cappuccino Songs as "a collection of sultry and evocative songs about love and yearning from the woman with the golden larynx". He also praised the "greater range and variety of styles and instrumentation" on the album in comparison to Tikaram's previous releases. Caroline Sullivan of The Guardian described the album as "surprisingly modern by the sombre songstress's standards" and "better than you'd expect". She added that the use of "sharp Latin horns, bumpy percussion and silky strings is an attractive change from the guitar-shaped blandness of before".

Track listing

Personnel
 Tanita Tikaram – vocals, acoustic guitar
 Marco Sabiu – piano, keyboards, computer programming, string arrangements
 Luís Jardim – bass, drums, percussion, vocals
 Mark Shulman, Rick Fenn – acoustic guitar
 Alessandro Cortini – guitar
 John Themis – guitar
 John Crawford – piano
 Tony Levin – bass
 Tubbs – bass
 Andy Duncan – drums, percussion
 Daniele de Gregorio – drums, percussion
 Robin Jones – congas
 João Bosco – bongos
 Adam Riley – timbales
 Andy Caine – backing vocals
 London Session Orchestra – strings
 Gavyn Wright – conductor

Production
 Marco Sabiu – producer (all tracks)
 Charlie Mallozzi – producer (track 7)
 Rafe McKenna – mixing (all tracks)
 Stephen Lironi – additional production and mixing (track 11)
 Jeremy Gill, John Musgrave, Richard Woodcroft, Savvas Iossifidus – assistant engineers
 Chris Blair, Ray Staff – mastering

Charts

References 

1998 albums
Tanita Tikaram albums